Cullin 3 is a protein that in humans is encoded by the CUL3 gene.

Cullin 3 protein belongs to the family of cullins which in mammals contains eight proteins (Cullin 1, Cullin 2, Cullin 3, Cullin 4A, Cullin 4B, Cullin 5, Cullin 7 and Cullin 9). Cullin proteins are an evolutionarily conserved family of proteins throughout yeast, plants and mammals.

Protein function 
Cullin 3 is a component of Cullin-RING E3 ubiquitin ligases complexes (CRLs) which are involved in protein ubiquitylation and represent a part of ubiquitin–proteasome system (UPS). Added ubiquitin moieties to the lysine residue by CRLs then target the protein for the proteasomal degradation. Cullin-RING E3 ubiquitin ligases are involved in many cellular processes responsible for cell cycle regulation, stress response, protein trafficking, signal transduction, DNA replication, transcription, protein quality control, circadian clock and development.

Deletion of CUL3 gene in mice causes embryonic lethality.

Cullin 3-RING E3 ubiquitin ligases 
Cullin 3-RING complex consists of Cullin 3 protein, RING-box protein 1 (RBX1), which recruits the ubiquitin-conjugating enzyme (E2), and a Bric-a-brac/Tramtrack/Broad (BTB) protein, a substrate recognition subunit. Cullin 3 protein is a core scaffold protein coordinating other components of the CRL complex. Cullin 3-RING complexes can also dimerise via their BTB domains which lead to creation of two substrate receptors and two catalytic RING domains.

Activation of the complex is regulated by the attachment of the ubiquitin-like protein NEDD8 to a conserved Lys residue in the cullin-homology domain, the process called neddylation. Deneddylation is conducted by an eight-subunit CSN complex which mediates the cleavage of the isopeptidic bond between NEDD8 and cullin protein. Another protein that interacts with cullin is CAND1 which binds to deneddylated form of cullin protein and disrupts the interaction between cullin and other subunits of the complex leading to inhibition of the E3 ubiquitin ligase activity. Therefore, dynamic neddylation and deneddylation of cullin is important for regulation of CRL complex activity.

Clinical significance

Familial hyperkalemic hypertension 
Mutations in CUL3 gene are associated with Familial hyperkalemic hypertension disease. CRL complex containing Cullin 3 controls the activity of Na+ Cl− cotransporter (NCC) in the kidney by regulating the proteasomal degradation of With-no-lysine [K] kinases WNK1 and WNK4. It was shown that mutations in CUL3 gene lead to WNKs accumulation. The abundance of these kinases leads to increased phosphorylation of NCC and its activation. As a consequence, Na+ reabsorption is increasing resulting in high blood pressure.

Cancer 
Deregulation of Cullin 3 expression level was observed in human cancers. It was shown that Cullin 3 is overexpressed in invasive cancers, and the protein expression level positively correlates with tumour stage. In breast cancer, the overexpression of Cullin 3 protein results in a decrease of Nrf2 protein level. This protein is a transcription factor regulating the expression of some detoxification and antioxidant enzymes. Another substrate of CRL complex is a candidate tumour suppressor protein RhoBTB2.

Interactions 

CUL3 has been shown to interact with:

 CAND1, 
 Cyclin E1,
 DCUN1D1, 
 KEAP1,  and
 KLHL12.

References

Further reading

External links